Harry Svendsen (2 January 1895 – 20 January 1960) was a Norwegian swimmer. He was born in Strömstad, Sweden, and his club was Oslo Kappsvømmingsklubb. He competed in backstroke at the 1912 Summer Olympics in Stockholm.

References

1895 births
1960 deaths
People from Strömstad Municipality
Swimmers at the 1912 Summer Olympics
Olympic swimmers of Norway
Norwegian male backstroke swimmers